Cryptaranea is a genus of South Pacific orb-weaver spiders first described by D. J. Court & Raymond Robert Forster in 1988.

Species
 it contains seven species, all found in New Zealand:
Cryptaranea albolineata (Urquhart, 1893) – New Zealand
Cryptaranea atrihastula (Urquhart, 1891) – New Zealand
Cryptaranea invisibilis (Urquhart, 1892) – New Zealand
Cryptaranea stewartensis Court & Forster, 1988 – New Zealand
Cryptaranea subalpina Court & Forster, 1988 – New Zealand
Cryptaranea subcompta (Urquhart, 1887) – New Zealand
Cryptaranea venustula (Urquhart, 1891) – New Zealand

References

Araneidae
Araneomorphae genera
Spiders of New Zealand
Taxa named by Raymond Robert Forster